Vijandren Ramadass is a Malaysian entrepreneur who founded Malaysia’s largest and oldest online community, Lowyat.net. Other than that he also serves as the CEO of Lowyat Media Group and Lowyat MSC Sdn Bhd

Background 
Vijandren Ramadass was born into a Malaysian Indian family in Kuala Lumpur. He holds a degree in computer science from Universiti Teknologi Malaysia, Skudai.

Lowyat.net 
Lowyat.NET began its life in 2002 as a simple single-page website to publish the latest price list of computers and gadgets from digital mall Plaza Low Yat in Kuala Lumpur.
 
Today, the domain boasts a lively forum community that has over half-a-million members, and reaches over six million unique visitors to its family of content sites.
 
In 2011, Lowyat Networks gained MSC Malaysia (Multimedia Super Corridor) status and expanded its portfolio by launching a women’s lifestyle portal, Lipstiq.com. Two more properties, Wanista.com & Hype.my, were then added to its staple.
 
In 2012, it added e-commerce solution and an online store Storekini.com to the fray, giving consumers an online outlet to get their shopping fixes.

References 

Living people
People from Kuala Lumpur
Malaysian businesspeople
Malaysian people of Indian descent
Tamil businesspeople
Businesspeople of Indian descent
Year of birth missing (living people)